St. Joseph's Church is a church in Gibraltar. It is located above the northeastern side of Gibraltar Harbour. The church is on Rodger's Road. There is a school of the same name in the vicinity.

References

Roman Catholic churches in Gibraltar